The Baojun 630 is a small family car/compact four-door notchback saloon and was the first car produced by SAIC-GM-Wuling through the Baojun brand. The 630 is manufactured in Liuzhou, Guangxi, China. It was launched at the 2011 Shanghai Auto Show, and went on sale in August 2011. A five-door hatchback derivative called the 610 was added to the range in April 2014.

Overview
The car was developed at the SAIC-GM Pan Asia Technical Automotive Center (PATAC) in Shanghai. While not visually similar to other GM cars, it has been suggested that the 630 and 610 is based on the Buick Excelle/Daewoo Lacetti platform.

In 2014, the car debuted in Egypt and Algeria as the Chevrolet Optra.

610 
The hatchback variant of the 630 is known as the 610.

A facelifted version was revealed for the first time in December 2015, featuring a slightly revised front end, a more important redesigned rear end, with larger tail lamps, and a heavily reworked dashboard.

Specification
The 630 is powered by a 1.5-litre 4-cylinder  1.5-litre (1,485 cc) engine producing  and mated to a five-speed transmission.

It can be equipped with front airbags, ABS with EBD, leather seats, power windows, remote central locking, air conditioning, trip computer, a CD player and rear parking sensors. The Baojun 630 is currently using pull-out door handles, similar to the facelifted Daewoo Lacetti.

References

External links

 Chevrolet Optra (rebadged Egyptian Baojun)

630
First car made by manufacturer
Front-wheel-drive vehicles
Cars introduced in 2011
2010s cars
Cars of China
Compact cars
Sedans
Hatchbacks